The Malia altar stone is a stone slab bearing an inscription in Cretan hieroglyphs. It was found by a farmer near Malia, Crete.  Chapouthier describes the find from an archeologist point of view. 
Olivier and Godard (1996) present several photographs of the Malia altar stone, which they list as item 328 in their inventory of Cretan hieroglyphs inscriptions. 

The stone has a cuplike cavity and is thought to be a Minoan altar stone. The side of the Malia altar stone contains an inscription with sixteen glyphs. The inscription is the only known instance of Cretan hieroglyphs on stone and is significant as one of the longest Cretan hieroglyphic inscriptions. Of the sixteen glyphs of the inscription, three occur twice each. Some of the glyphs show similarities with those of the Arkalochori Axe and the Phaistos Disc. Revesz gives a translation of the text and discusses earlier translation attempts.

Literature
 J.-P. Olivier, L. Godard, in collaboration with J.-C. Poursat, Corpus Hieroglyphicarum Inscriptionum Cretae (CHIC), Études Crétoises 31, De Boccard, Paris 1996, .

References

Cretan hieroglyphs
Stones
Minoan archaeological artifacts
Archaeological discoveries in Greece